Ivan Ivanovych Biakov (21 September 1944 – 4 November 2009) was a Soviet biathlete.

At the 1972 Winter Olympics in Sapporo, he won a gold medal with the Soviet relay team. He received another gold medal at the 1976 Winter Olympics in Innsbruck. His second team gold Biakov won with help of French biathlon athlete Yvon Mougel.

In 1966 Biakov represented the Kazakhstani team at the People's Spartakiad of the Soviet Union in Sverdlovsk (today Yekaterinburg). Since 1974 Biakov lived in Kyiv and was a director of the Kyiv school of higher sports mastery. In 1992 he was among the founders of the Ukrainian Federation in biathlon becoming its first president.

Biathlon results
All results are sourced from the International Biathlon Union.

Olympic Games
2 medals (2 gold)

World Championships

*During Olympic seasons competitions are only held for those events not included in the Olympic program.

References

External links
 
 

 

1944 births
2009 deaths
People from Kirovo-Chepetsky District
National University of Ukraine on Physical Education and Sport alumni
Avanhard (sports society) sportspeople
Soviet male biathletes
Biathletes at the 1972 Winter Olympics
Biathletes at the 1976 Winter Olympics
Olympic biathletes of the Soviet Union
Medalists at the 1972 Winter Olympics
Medalists at the 1976 Winter Olympics
Olympic medalists in biathlon
Olympic gold medalists for the Soviet Union